This is a list of largest cities in the Arab world. The Arab world is here defined as the 22 member states of the Arab League.

Largest cities
Largest cities in the Arab world by official cities proper:

See also 
List of largest metropolitan areas of the Middle East
List of Arab countries by population
List of largest cities in the Levant region by population

References 

Cities
Arab League
Cities,largest
Arab world
Cities,largest